Ad Infinitum is a Swiss/German symphonic metal band. Originally a solo project of Swiss singer Melissa Bonny, it turned into a full band with arrival of drummer Niklas Müller, bassist Jonas Asplind and guitarist Adrian Theßenvitz. The band signed a deal with Napalm Records in July 2019 and released a debut album – Chapter I: Monarchy – in April 2020. In December 2020, Asplind announced he is leaving the band due to health issues, to be replaced by Korbinian Benedict as the new bassist.

History 
Ad Infinitum began as a solo project of Rage of Light vocalist Melissa Bonny. In November 2018, she released a debut single, I Am the Storm, recorded with guest musicians including Delain guitarist Timo Somers, and launched a crowdfunding campaign to help her finance the production of an upcoming album. The campaign was a success, and during 2019 the project expanded to include drummer Niklas Müller and guitarist Adrian Theßenvitz from Germany, and Follow the Cipher bassist Jonas Asplind from Sweden, and signed to Napalm Records.

On 31 January 2020, the band announced their debut album, Chapter I: Monarchy, to be released on 3 April 2020, and launched the first single from the album, Marching on Versailles. Two more singles preceded the release of the album – See You in Hell on 28 February 2020, and Live Before You Die on 27 March 2020.

On 29 October 2020, the band announced Chapter I Revisited, an acoustic version of the debut album, to be digitally released on 4 December 2020, and presented acoustic rendition of the lead single, Marching on Versailles.

On 27 December 2020, the band posted a video on its official YouTube channel, announcing Jonas was leaving the band due to health issues with his knee, and welcomed the new bassist, Korbinian Benedict. In the same video, the new bassist confirmed that the band is currently working on their upcoming album.

On 26 August 2021 the band announced their upcoming album, Chapter II: Legacy. It was released on 29 October and they released their first single Unstoppable from the album.

Members 
Current members
 Melissa Bonny – vocals (2018–present)
 Adrian Theßenvitz – guitars (2019–present)
 Niklas Müller – drums (2019–present)
 Korbinian Benedict – bass (2020–present)

Former members
 Jonas Asplind – bass (2019–2020)

Timeline

Discography 
Singles
 "I Am the Storm" (2018)
 "Marching on Versailles" (2020)
 "See You in Hell" (2020)
 "Live Before You Die" (2020)
 "Fire and Ice" (2020)
 "Marching on Versailles (acoustic)" (2020)
 "Demons (acoustic)" (2020)
 "Unstoppable" (2021)
 "Afterlife ft. Nils Molin" (2021)
 "Animals" (2021)
 "Inferno" (2021)
 "Seth" (2023)
Albums
 Chapter I: Monarchy (2020)
 Chapter I Revisited (2020)
 Chapter II: Legacy (2021)
 Chapter III: Downfall (2023)

References 

Swiss symphonic metal musical groups
Napalm Records artists
Musical groups established in 2018
2018 establishments in Switzerland
Female-fronted musical groups